The twenty-seventh season of Saturday Night Live, an American sketch comedy series, originally aired in the United States on NBC between September 29, 2001 and May 18, 2002.

Eighteen days before the season started, the September 11 terrorist attacks took place in New York. The season premiere (hosted by Reese Witherspoon) went on as scheduled, with a special cold open featuring Rudy Giuliani, the Mayor of New York City at the time, along with firefighters from the FDNY and police officers from the NYPD, declaring that despite the terrorist attack, New York City will run as normal and Saturday Night Live will go on as planned (with Lorne Michaels asking Giuliani "Can we be funny?" and Giuliani replying "Why start now?").

Three weeks into the season the show faced another scare when anthrax was found in the GE Building (from where the show is broadcast). The scare caused most of the cast and crew, as well as that week's guest host Drew Barrymore, to evacuate the building.

Cast
Before the start of the season, longtime cast member Molly Shannon, who had been on the show for seven seasons since 1995, departed midway through the previous season on her own terms, and Jerry Minor and Chris Parnell were both let go from the show. However, Parnell was hired back to the show mid-season in the episode hosted by Jonny Moseley, becoming the second cast member to be hired back to the show after being fired, the first person being Jim Belushi in 1983.

Four new cast members were hired to the show: stand-up comic Dean Edwards, Chicago improv comedian Seth Meyers, Amy Poehler of the Upright Citizens Brigade comedy troupe, and stand-up comic/impressionist Jeff Richards who was previously a cast member on the rival sketch show MADtv. Rachel Dratch, Tina Fey and Maya Rudolph were all upgraded to repertory status at the beginning of the season, and Poehler was promoted to repertory status mid-season.

Will Ferrell was absent from a number of episodes because he was filming Old School. This would also be the final season for both Ferrell and Ana Gasteyer.

Cast roster

Repertory players
Rachel Dratch
Jimmy Fallon
Will Ferrell
Tina Fey 
Ana Gasteyer
Darrell Hammond
Chris Kattan
Tracy Morgan
Chris Parnell (first episode back: March 2, 2002)
Amy Poehler (upgraded to repertory status: January 12, 2002)
Maya Rudolph
Horatio Sanz

Featured players
Dean Edwards
Seth Meyers
Jeff Richards

bold denotes "Weekend Update" anchor

Writers

Episodes

Special

References

27
Saturday Night Live in the 2000s
2001 American television seasons
2002 American television seasons
Television shows directed by Beth McCarthy-Miller